Roger J. Carey  (1865–1895), was a Major League Baseball player who played in one game for the 1887 New York Giants.

External links

1865 births
1895 deaths
Major League Baseball second basemen
New York Giants (NL) players
19th-century baseball players
Lynn Lions players
Scranton Miners players
Austin Senators players
Akron Akrons players
Baseball players from New York (state)
Burials at Calvary Cemetery (Queens)